Larry (born ) is a British domestic tabby cat who has served as Chief Mouser to the Cabinet Office at 10 Downing Street since 2011. Larry is cared for by Downing Street staff and is not the personal property of the prime minister. 

He has served during the premierships of five prime ministers: David Cameron, Theresa May, Boris Johnson, Liz Truss, and Rishi Sunak.

Early life
Larry is a rescued stray cat from the Battersea Dogs & Cats Home who was chosen by Downing Street staff. Larry was intended to be a pet for the children of David and Samantha Cameron and was described by Downing Street sources as a "good ratter" and as having "a high chase-drive and hunting instinct". In 2012, Battersea Dogs & Cats Home revealed that Larry's popularity had resulted in a 15 percent surge of people adopting cats.

Soon after he was taken in at Downing Street, a story ran in the press claiming that Larry was a lost cat and that the original owner had started a campaign to retrieve him. However, the story was later revealed to be a hoax and no such owner nor campaign existed.

Career

Official duties
The Downing Street website describes Larry's duties as "greeting guests to the house, inspecting security defences and testing antique furniture for napping quality". It says he is "contemplating a solution to the mouse occupancy of the house" and has told Downing Street that such a solution is still in the "tactical planning stage". Unlike his predecessors since 1929, Larry's upkeep is funded by the staff of 10 Downing Street. Fund-raising events to pay for his food are believed to have included a quiz night for Downing Street staff held in the state rooms. David Cameron explained during his final Prime Minister's Questions in 2016 that Larry is a civil servant and not personal property, and would thus not leave Downing Street after a change of premiership.  Larry has retained his position through all the May, Johnson, Truss, and Sunak administrations.

Work as chief mouser

He made his first known kill, a mouse, on 22 April 2011.  On 28 August 2012, Larry made his first public killing, dropping his prey on the lawn in front of Number 10.  In October 2013, Larry caught four mice in two weeks and one staff member rescued a mouse from his clutches.

In July 2015, George Osborne, Chancellor of the Exchequer, and Cabinet Office minister Matt Hancock cornered a mouse in the Chancellor's office, trapping it in a brown paper sandwich bag. The press joked that Osborne might take over the position of Chief Mouser.

In December 2015, former Home Secretary David Blunkett suggested that Larry should be asked to increase his responsibilities to include the Palace of Westminster that at the time was being overrun by rodents.

Relationships with politicians

David Cameron has said that Larry is a "bit nervous" around men, speculating that, since Larry was a rescue cat, this may be due to negative experiences in his past. Cameron mentioned that Barack Obama is an apparent exception to this fear: he said, "Funnily enough he liked Obama. Obama gave him a stroke and he was all right with Obama." In 2011, Larry was banned from the Prime Minister's quarters in 10 Downing Street as his fur was ruining Cameron's fresh suits. In February 2013, a cat-proof barrier was erected to prevent Larry and his neighbour Freya from getting into the Foreign Office, after complaints from staff members with allergies. Foreign Secretary William Hague later asked that the barrier be taken down.

In September 2013, tensions were reportedly growing between Cameron and Larry. It was reported that Cameron objected to cat hair on his suit and the smell of cat food had to be disguised by air freshener when Downing Street had visitors. The Camerons were said not to like Larry, amid suggestions that the pet was a public relations prop. Cameron posted to Twitter saying that he and Larry got on "purr-fectly well". Nevertheless, bookmakers Ladbrokes made Cameron the odds-on (1/2) favourite to leave Downing Street first, with Larry as the 6/4 outsider. The Daily Telegraph suggested that Cameron never really liked cats but that spin doctors believed Larry could make the Prime Minister appear more friendly. 

Former Deputy Prime Minister Nick Clegg has described an internal Downing Street security door which requires microphone contact for access as being increasingly "not for security but to keep the cats out from one end of the building to another".  When leaving office in 2016, Cameron spoke of his "sadness" that he could not take Larry with him. When Theresa May became Prime Minister in 2016, there were concerns that Larry was stressed and could be missing the Cameron family.

In August 2016, Sir Alistair Graham, former Chairman of the Committee on Standards in Public Life, responded to controversy over favouritism in Cameron's Dissolution Honours List by joking that he was "surprised Larry the cat didn't get one". In June 2019, in what was described in the press as a photobombing, Larry was visible on the window ledge outside Number 10 as Theresa May and her husband Philip May posed with U.S. President Donald Trump and his wife Melania Trump at the start of Trump's state visit to the United Kingdom; he later sheltered from the rain under Trump's armoured Cadillac and could not be coaxed out, leading Jon Sopel of the BBC to tweet: "BREAKING: anti-Trump demonstrators fail to stop @realDonaldTrump motorcade, but @Number10cat does".

Relationships with other animals
In June 2012, Chancellor of the Exchequer George Osborne was reunited with his long lost cat Freya, who moved into 11 Downing Street. Freya and Larry were reported to have rapidly established cordial relations, although the two cats had been seen fighting. Freya was reported to be the more dominant cat and more effective mouser, reportedly because her days as a stray had "hardened" her. In November 2014, Freya left Downing Street, leaving Larry with the sole mousing responsibility.

In 2014, Osborne brought in a pet dog, Lola. Aides announced that Lola got on well with both Larry and Freya. 

In September 2019, a new dog, Dilyn (owned by new prime minister Boris Johnson and his partner Carrie Symonds), came to stay at Downing Street. Battersea Dogs & Cats Home offered to negotiate a deal with Larry. In December 2020, Larry stalked a pigeon outside Boris Johnson's official residence, and even managed to catch it. Despite the seemingly effective attack, the pigeon managed to fly off, apparently unharmed, after the brief scuffle. In October 2022, Larry chased away a fox from outside 10 Downing Street. The incident was captured on CCTV.

Rivalry with Palmerston
In April 2016, a new feline neighbour, Palmerston, moved into the Foreign Office. Although known to get along from time to time, the two cats have fought on numerous occasions. The Leader of the House commented that he hoped that Palmerston and Larry would establish a "modus vivendi". In July of that year, Palmerston entered Number 10 and had to be forcibly evicted by security staff. In September 2016, Lord Blencathra submitted a question in the House of Lords asking why the government did not pay for Larry's veterinary bill for an injury picked up in a fight against Palmerston, and whether the government would refund civil servants who paid for Larry's care. Baroness Chisholm of Owlpen, the government's spokesman in the Lords, said: "The costs were met by staff through voluntary staff donations due to their affection for Larry."

On 1 August 2016, according to the political photographer Steve Beck, Larry had his "most brutal fight yet" with Palmerston on the steps of Number 10. During the fight, Larry lost his collar, whilst Palmerston suffered from several deep scratches and a badly cut ear. When Palmerston "wrote" a letter announcing he was retiring and moving to the countryside on 7 August 2020, BBC News reported that Palmerston's "decidedly undiplomatic disputes [with Larry] are not thought to have hastened his departure".

Criticism
Larry has been criticised for both his temperament and job performance. Within a month of his arrival at Downing Street, anonymous sources described Larry as having "a distinct lack of killer instinct."

Later that year, it was revealed that Larry spent more time sleeping than hunting for mice, and shared the company of a female cat, Maisie. At one point in 2011, mice were so endemic in Downing Street that the Prime Minister, David Cameron, resorted to throwing a fork at one during a Cabinet dinner. Larry was almost fired from his position in 2012, when he failed to react to a mouse spotted in Cameron's study. His lack of killer instinct also earned him the nickname "Lazy Larry" by the tabloid press. In September 2012, Freya was also appointed the role of Chief Mouser to the Cabinet Office in a job share arrangement.

Awards and recognition
Larry was honoured with a blue plaque at Battersea Dogs and Cats Home in October 2012.

The beetle species Caccothryptus larryi, first described in 2021, is named after him.

In popular culture

A book, written in character as Larry, Larry Diaries: Downing Street – the First 100 Days by former Guardian journalist James Robinson was published in 2011.

A picture gallery to celebrate Larry's first two years in office was produced by The Daily Telegraph.

In 2012, Larry was visible on the Google Street View of Number 10, asleep next to the door.

Larry's exploits and observations on life at Number 10 became the subject of a weekly cartoon in The Sunday Express drawn by cartoonist Ted Harrison.

Larry is subject of the book Larry at Number 10 by Elizabeth Radcliffe, published on 7 January 2021.

See also
 Gladstone (cat) – Chief Mouser of HM Treasury
 List of individual cats

References

External links

 Video of meowing match between Larry and with Palmerston, the Foreign Office's cat
 Map indicating the residencies of the Chief Mousers
 Larry's official bio
 International Cat Day: the art of photographing Larry, the beloved Downing Street cat | AFP

|-

2007 animal births
British civil servants
Individual cats in England
Individual cats in politics
Working cats
Chief Mousers to the Cabinet Office